Linda Susanna Isaksson Lindorff, née Isaksson (born 9 February 1972) is a Swedish television presenter, reporter and former weather presenter. She was crowned Miss Sweden in 1990 and represented her country at Miss Universe the same year.

Lindorff was a reporter and weather presenter at TV3s News show between 1998 and 2001. Later she became a television presenter for TV4 on the shows När & fjärran, Djur i fara, Robinson 2009 and The Farm. She is currently presenting Bonde söker fru. In 2009 she married the photographer Jacob Lindorff. The couple have three children together. Lindorff participated in Let's Dance 2016 which was broadcast on TV4.

References

External links 

 

1972 births
Living people
Miss Sweden winners
Miss Universe 1990 contestants
People from Vilhelmina Municipality
Swedish television personalities
Swedish women television presenters
20th-century Swedish women